No Names on the Doors is a 1997 Israeli drama directed by Nadav Levitan. The film was screened at the Berlin International Film Festival, the Montpellier Film Festival, the Shanghai International Film Festival, and the Melbourne International Film Festival. It received two nominations for an Ophir Award in the categories of Best Actor and Best Screenplay.

No Names on the Doors is the third film in director Levitan's trilogy about Israeli kibbutzim, following An Intimate Story (1981) and Stalin's Disciples (1986).

Plot
The film is set on a modern kibbutz as the spectre of an Arab invasion lurks in the background and financial pressures are breaking down traditional communal values. A series of fragile, interwoven stories mirror this disintegration of collective ideals: a longstanding friendship between two 40-year-old bachelors (Danni Bassan and Meir Swissa) ends tragically when one decides to get married; a bereaved father is embarrassed to find himself attracted to his dead son's girlfriend (Dorit Lev-Ari); and a mother (Chava Alberstein) perpetuates the memory of her dead son by tending to his room as a memorial. At the same time, an elderly man (Mosko Alkalai) discovers a new, more loving relationship with his intellectually-disabled adult son (Avi Pnini).

Cast
Chava Alberstein as Adina
Mosko Alkalai as Kuba
Assi Dayan as Uzi
Avi Pnini as Israel
Micha Selekter as Amos
Dorit Lev-Ari as Aya
Danni Bassan as Mordi
Dan Wolman as Joseph
Abraham Sandberg as GP
Louise Zarchi as Shoshana
Hekena Wallport as Suskia
Shlomo Tarshish as Ely
Meir Swissa as Simcha

Reception
Deborah Young of Variety wrote that Levitan's third film in his kibbutz trilogy "brings the action to the present day to show the sad dissolution of collective ideals that were these agricultural co-ops' raison d'etre. Though not exceptionally original, the fragile, interwoven stories have a sincere, heartfelt quality that should play well in specialized film weeks and venues."  Kevin Thomas of the Los Angeles Times called the movie "tender" and "moving".

References

External links
 
 Israel Film Fund [Hebrew]

1997 films
1990s Hebrew-language films
Films about the kibbutz
Films directed by Nadav Levitan
1997 drama films
Israeli drama films